The 1960–61 Silver Hut expedition or formally the Himalayan Scientific and Mountaineering Expedition was initiated by Edmund Hillary and Griffith Pugh with John Dienhart of World Books in America (producers of a children’s encyclopaedia). The expedition lasted from September 1960 to June 1961.

In 1958 Hillary and Pugh had discussed whether Everest could be climbed without oxygen; with improved acclimatising by wintering at say  for six months beforehand. But Pugh’s plans involving two bases on Everest (Base camp, and on the Western Cwm at  feet) had been dropped by Hillary as a request to the Chinese had been rebuffed because of troubles in Tibet. And finance was needed; Hillary wrote to Pugh in 1959 "I’m damn certain that we’d get someone on the top (of Everest) without oxygen but we’d need a lot of cash".  
In 1959 Hillary was awarded the Explorer of the Year Award by Argosy magazine; $US1000 and a trip to New York to address the award banquet. His speech and personality impressed Dienhart who invited him to their Chicago headquarters. Hillary estimated the expedition cost at $US120,000 and after meeting him in Chicago in October 1959 the World Book board gave him $US125,000 and a "practically free hand".

Nepal and the Silver Hut base 
The expedition gathered in Kathmandu in September 1960, destination the Rolwaling Valley; reputed to be a Yeti stronghold and where Shipton with Ward and the Sherpa Sen Tenzing had photographed the footprint in 1951.  At the end of October the expedition went via the  Tashi Laptsa Pass to the Khumbu region.  Norman Hardie led a party of 310 Nepali porters with parts of the hut, the laboratory equipment and winter supplies. He set up a base at the village of Changmatang near the entrance to the Mingbo Valley.

Research accommodation was in the prefabricated Silver Hut and an adjacent tent. The Silver Hut was six meters long and three meters wide with a panoramic view from windows at the laboratory end. The setting was spectacular, between the "vertiginous walls" of Ama Dablam and behind them the cirque of steep ice and rock of the Mingbo La. A kerosene stove separated the living-space with eight bunks and a dining table from the laboratory with a bicycle ergometer and equipment benches.   
Hillary had originally picked the crest of the Mingbo Valley, located on the col of the Mingbo Valley for the research base. But the pass was up a  feet slope of steep ice and winds funnelled over the pass. So Hardie and Hillary agreed that the névé 500 feet lower was better and safer. But the absent Pugh (though he agreed that it was safer there) was displeased at not being consulted, though he had been at Changmatang for two weeks; an early indication of the difficult relationship between Hillary and Pugh. 

The scientific phase of the expedition here lasted from November 1960 to March 1961. The "wintering party" was Pugh with Bishop, Gill, Lahiri, Milledge, Ward and West and Sherpas Siku, Dawa Tensing and Mingma Norbu. The party all lost weight, an indication of high-altitude deterioration. For lung and heart function assessment, oxygen and carbon dioxide is measured in lungs and blood. At sea level blood leaving the lungs is nearly fully saturated with oxygen but there it dropped to seventy percent. An important finding was that during exercise saturation dropped further, sometimes below fifty percent despite a huge increase in the breathing rate; this explains why climbing upwards at high altitude is extraordinarily exhausting even if feeling comfortable at rest. 

Later the Silver Hut was disassembled and given to Tenzing Norgay for the institute’s high training base in Sikkim.

The Yeti Hunt  
The Yeti Hunt was to find evidence either proving or disproving the existence of the Yeti. It was supported by Marlin Perkins the Director of the Lincoln Park Zoo in Chicago well-known for the TV programme "Wild Kingdom" and he hoped that they could capture a yeti. Perkins thought that the best evidence was the 1951 photos of yeti tracks by Eric Shipton, Michael Ward and Sherpa Sen Tenzing;  although these were later dismissed as a joke, with Shipton and Bill Tilman  having a "running yeti joke" rivalry. Hillary said in 1984 of the 1951 photo that "Eric (Shipton) was a joker ... he’s gone around it (the footprint) with his knuckles, shaped the toe, pressed in the middle. There’s no animal could walk with a foot like that. He made it up ... " 
Hillary chose the Rowaling Valley to start after three weeks acclimatizing; it was reputed to be a Yeti stronghold and where the supposed 1951 photographs of Yeti footprints had been taken. Doig said he would pay for a yeti, dead or alive, or for parts. They got a supposed yeti scalp, three Tibetan blue bear skins, a goat skin, a dried human hand, two small red pandas and a fox. 
They set up cameras, telescopes, tripwires and capchur guns around the Ripimu Glacier at  feet. At the end of October they left for the Khumbu region via the Tashi Laptsas Pass, and borrowed a 200-year old Yeti relic at the Jhumjung Monastery. Hillary and Doig took the "scalp" to Chicago in December 1960.

The Assault on Ama Dablam 
A party of leader Mike Ward and Barry Bishop, Mike Gill and Wally Romanes made the first ascent to the  summit of Ama Dablam on 13 March, starting on 11 March. Hillary had expected just a preliminary look at what looked to be an "impossibility difficult" challenge; he was surprised, but wondered if the Nepalese government would have a problem about (lack of) permission to climb. The difficult section, the vertical rock of the first step, had been investigated on 24 and 25 March. In 1979 Peter Hillary’s party was climbing the face when they were struck by an ice avalanche.

But eight days later a message arrived from the Nepali Foreign Secretary cancelling the party’s permit to climb Makalu in view of the "unauthorised ascent of AMADABLAM"; although their permit did authorise work in the Mingbo and to "climb adjacent peaks". However, through Desmond Doig who knew the new Prime Minister Dr Tulsi Giri, Hillary got permission to continue as a "special case" after writing an unqualified apology. Possible reasons for the official displeasure were international criticism of King Mahendra for shutting down Parliament, the wide publicity given to the ascent, and even because Hillary attended the state banquet on 27 February during Queen Elizabeth’s state visit in a lounge suit rather than in a dinner suit wearing his decorations (Sir Edward (sic) Hillary and Mrs E. (sic) Hillary had been invited at the last minute).

The Assault on Makalu   
The third object of the expedition was to acclimatise a party of climbers who would summit Makalu without oxygen. There were to be three scientific camps where the bicycle ergonometer would be used: Base Camp, camp 3 on the neve and Camp 5 ( on Makalu Col. At Camps 6 and 7 and the summit only alveolar air samples would be taken. Camp 3 was established by the end of April 1961 then Camp 4. Camp 2 was at  

Mt Makalu is the fifth-highest mountain in the world. Hillary had been at near-death on the mountain in 1954 with cerebral and pulmonary edema. On 4 May at Camp 4 he was unwell and went back to Camp 2 then Base Camp and back to Khumjung; it was the end of his days as a serious climber.

The first assault on 13 May (Gill, Romanes and Ortenberger) got above camp 6 in gale force winds but had to turn back; they found the altitude "much tougher than they expected." 

He was an appalling sight and it was a miracle he was still alive. Doig arranged a helicopter which took Mulgrew with Ward and Ang Temba from the Barun Valley to Shanta Bhawan Hospitlal in Khatmandu His life had been saved by the efforts of Nevison, Ortenburger and the Sherpas Urkien, Pemba Tharkey, Siku and Pemba Tenzing. 

A third assault team of Harrison and Ward had been planned.

In 1955 a French team using oxygen put nine French climbers and a Sherpa on the summit. Gill says that while pulmonary infarcts are rare, the French team in 1954 was fitter and used oxygen day and night from Camp 4; and also that the mountain was very windy: Jean Franco wrote that Makalu Col was "the kingdom of the wind". Everest was first climbed without oxygen by Reinhold Messner and Peter Habeler in 1978.

The Personnel  
Edmund Hillary, Griffith Pugh and fellow climbers Norman Hardie, George Lowe, Peter Mulgrew, Michael Ward, John Harrison (NZ), Leigh Ortenberger (US), Wally Romanes (NZ) and American photographer Barry Bishop.

Several doctors, most with expertise in respiratory physiology and also mountaineering: John West, Jim Milledge (UK), Sukhamay Lahiri (India), Tom Nevison (US, USAF) and Michael Gill (NZ, medical student).

Himalayan Adventure Intl Treks can organize Ama Dablam Expedition and Journalist Desmond Doig from the "Calcutta Statesman" who spoke Nepali (having fought with the Gurkhas).

Sherpas Siku, Dawa Tensing, Mingma Norbu and others.

Achievements 

The scientific programme was an unqualified success, and the expedition became one of the classic studies in high-altitude physiology. West, Ward and Milledge wrote a textbook "High Altitude Medicine and Physiology" which by 2021 was in its sixth edition.

Hillary’s search for the fabled Yeti or "abominable snowman" found no evidence, and footprints and tracks were proven to be from other causes. Hillary travelled to remote temples which contained "Yeti scalps"; however after bringing back three relics, two were shown to be from bears and one from a goat antelope. Hillary said after the expedition: "The yeti is not a strange, superhuman creature as has been imagined. We have found  rational explanations for most yeti phenomena".  All the Yeti relics were from Tibetan blue bears, red pandas or goats, and Hillary said that another yeti-hunt would be a "sheer waste of money" But with the permission to remove for examination a "Yeti scalp" in the Khumjung Monastery in the Khumbu region he was asked to build a school in Khumjung; this led to a new project for Hillary; schools and healthcare for Sherpas through the Himalayan Trust.

While Hillary had money from books, he did not get any business or diplomatic jobs in New Zealand. In January 1962 the family left for Chicago where Hillary flew every week to speak to "World Bookers" the company’s sales staff throughout America. Then he became a director of the Australasian branch of World Books for an annual salary of $10,000. In January 1982 he joined the Ted Williams Sports Advisory staff of Sears Roebuck, Sears tents were provided for school-building; and a salary which increased from $1000 to $40,000 per annum.

References  

 
   
 
 High Altitude Medicine and Physiology by John B. West, Robert B. Schoene, Andrew M. Luks and James S. Milledge (5th edition 2012); CRC Press, Boca Raton Florida.

1960 in Nepal
1961 in Nepal
1960 in science
1961 in science
Mountaineering expeditions to the Himalayas
Mountaineering and health
Human physiology
Edmund Hillary